"London Boys" is a song by English glam rock act T. Rex. It was released a single in 1976 by record label T. Rex Wax Co. The track was not released on an album, but was originally intended to feature in Bolan's aborted rock operas The London Opera and Billy Super Duper.

Content 

Like all of T. Rex's music, the song is written by Marc Bolan.

Release 

"London Boys" was released as a single on 21 February 1976 by record label T. Rex Wax Co. The track was not released on an album, but was originally intended to feature in Bolan's aborted rock operas The London Opera and Billy Super Duper. Its B-side, "Solid Baby", is taken from T. Rex's tenth studio album Bolan's Zip Gun (1975).

The song was in the UK charts for a total of three weeks, peaking at No. 40.

References 

1976 singles
T. Rex (band) songs
Songs written by Marc Bolan
Song recordings produced by Marc Bolan
EMI Records singles
1976 songs
Songs about London